is a politician of the Constitutional Democratic Party of Japan, a member of the House of Councillors in the Diet (national legislature). He is currently the secretary general of the CDP. A native of Tokyo, he graduated from Doshisha University and received a master's degree from Kyoto University. After running unsuccessfully for the House of Representatives in 1996, he was elected to the House of Councillors for the first time in 1998.

References

External links 
 Official website in Japanese.

1962 births
Living people
Doshisha University alumni
Kyoto University alumni
Members of the House of Councillors (Japan)
Constitutional Democratic Party of Japan politicians
Democratic Party of Japan politicians